Liga e Tretë is the fourth level of football in Kosovo. It consists of 26 teams that are divided geographically in two groups and play each other twice (home and away) during the season. At the end of the season, the top two teams in the division are promoted to the Second Football League of Kosovo.

From the season 2019–20 the best seven clubs from each group of the previous season of the Liga e Dytë play in new formed and unique Second League while the other clubs have relegated into the new formed Third League.

Clubs (2019–20)

Dukagjin Region

Kosova Region

Notes

References

4
Kos